A List of English National Basketball League seasons since the inception of the National Basketball League in 1972  until 1987 when the British basketball League seasons started. List of British Basketball League seasons.

References